Chanaq Bulagh (also Romanized as Chanāq Bulāgh) is a village in Sardabeh Rural District, Central District, Ardabil County, Ardabil Province, Iran. At the 2006 census, its population was 42, in 14 families.

References 

Populated places in Ardabil County